Ziana Zain is the eponymous second studio album from Malaysian pop artist Ziana Zain. It was released in Malaysia in 1993. For the album, Ziana reunited with composers M. Nasir, Saari Amri and Asmin Mudin as well as new composers such as Zuriani Khalid and Anuar. The album features one Japanese song, "Chitose-Bashi", which was originally recorded by Mieko Nishijima. The song previously appeared on the album Asian Voices, a compilation album of popular Japanese songs. The track, "Hadir Mu", was originally recorded by Italian singer Eros Ramazzotti as "Amarti è l'immenso per me" for his fifth studio album In ogni senso. It was translated into the Malay language and recorded by Ziana as a duet with Izzaka.

The first single, "Anggapan Mu" topping the Carta Muzik-Muzik and many radio charts in Malaysia. The second single, "Putus Terpaksa", also topped Carta Muzik-Muzik, but it received mixed reviews with critics panning its high pitch structure as well as its lyrics which were rumoured to portray a girl falling in love with a drug addict. Both singles were shortlisted in the semi-final of 1993's Anugerah Juara Lagu, but neither of the songs made it to the final round.

Ziana Zain has been certified Platinum by the RIM for selling 85,000 copies.

Track listing
 "Putus Terpaksa" (Saari Amri) — 5:06
 "Mimpi Mu Bukan Mimpi Ku" (Zuriani, Nanee) — 4:43
 "Hadir Mu" (featuring Izzaka) (Eros Ramazzotti, Nanee) — 4:46
 "Kaulah Penentunya" (Bullet, Lap, Zuriani, Nanee) — 3:41
 "Rindu Yang Ku Pendam" (M. Nasir, Bob) — 5:46
 "Kasih Ku Pertahankan" (Anuar, Azam Dungun) — 5:21
 "Ku Cinta Pada Mu" (Zuriani, Nanee) — 4:13
 "Anggapan Mu" (Asmin Mudin) — 4:35
 "Disini Selamanya" (Zuriani, Nanee) — 4:18
 "Chitose-Bashi" (Mieko Nishijima, Kenji Kadoya) — 5:02

Award

Anugerah Juara Lagu
"Anggapan Mu" and "Putus Terpaksa" reached the semi-final of 1993's Anugerah Juara Lagu, but neither reached the final.

|-
| rowspan=2| 1993 || "Anggapan Mu" || rowspan=2|Best Ballad song || 
|-
| "Putus Terpaksa" || 
|-

Personnel
 Producer: Zuriani, M. Nasir, Saari Amri & Anuar
 Executive Producer: Aziz Bakar
 Executive A&R: Shahlan & Hamid
 Studio: Digitron, Trax, Artcell & Luncai Emas Studio R. Ronggeng
 Assistant: Amir Mohamed
 Artwork Design: Nizam & Din @ Ad Verse
 Promotions: Erick Yew, Baharina Baharin, Shahrin Mohd, Jeamie Lee & Wong Mei Chen

References

Ziana Zain albums
1993 albums
Bertelsmann Music Group albums
Malay-language albums